Dongargaon is the name of several towns or villages within India, and may refer to:

 Dongargaon, Agar Malwa, a village in the Agar Malwa district of Madhya Pradesh
 Dongargaon, Bhopal, a village in the Bhopal district of Madhya Pradesh
 Dongargaon, Indore, a village in the Indore district of Madhya Pradesh 
 Dongargaon, Mawal, a village in the Pune district of Maharashtra

See also
 Dongargarh, a town in the Rajnandgaon district of Chhattisgarh